Drømmen (Danish "The Dream", English: We Shall Overcome) is a 2006 Danish film based on a true story about a young boy's crusade against a dictatorial headmaster of the "old school", in 1969 Denmark.

The film is directed by Danish screenwriter and film director Niels Arden Oplev and stars Bent Mejding and Anders W. Berthelsen. It won sixteen awards in 2006 and 2007.

Synopsis 
The story opens in the Danish countryside of 1969. Denmark and the rest of the world are changing rapidly but Lindum-Svendsen, the headmaster of the rural school, hasn't noticed.

Frits is a young boy who spends his summer holidays watching the family's first television, and is influenced by the American civil rights movement. The sermons and speeches of Martin Luther King Jr., who was assassinated in 1968, coupled with his own dreams of a better life, have given Frits courage and a desire for rebellion. The dictatorial Lindum-Svendsen steps over the line while punishing Frits, drawing the ire of youthful new teacher Freddie Svale, which encourages Frits to take up battle against the headmaster.

Cast 
 Bent Mejding as headmaster Lindum-Svendsen
  as Frits Johansen
 Anders W. Berthelsen as Freddie Svale
 Jens Jørn Spottag as Peder, Frits' father
  as Erling
  as Stine, Frits' mother
 Gyrd Løfqvist as Frits' grandfather
  as Frits' grandmother
  as teacher Olsen
  as school doctor
  as sexton
 Sarah Juel Werner as Iben
 Daniel Ørum as Troels
 Lasse Borg as Søren
 Joy-Maria Frederiksen as Iben's mother

Accolades 
The film has won sixteen awards in 2006 and 2007.

References

External links 
 
 
 
 
 English film trailer of We Shall Overcome
 Danish film trailer of We Shall Overcome

Best Danish Film Robert Award winners
Danish drama films
Films directed by Niels Arden Oplev
Films set in 1969
Films set in Denmark